Devin Eric Lloyd (born September 30, 1998) is an American football linebacker for the Jacksonville Jaguars of the National Football League (NFL). He played college football at Utah and was drafted by the Jaguars in the first round of the 2022 NFL Draft.

Early years
Lloyd attended Otay Ranch High School in Chula Vista, California. He played safety, wide receiver and was a punter in high school. He was not highly recruited as 3 star recruit when he committed to the University of Utah, his only power five offer, to play college football over offers from UNLV, Colorado State, Sacramento State, San Jose State, and Utah State.

College career

After redshirting his first year at Utah in 2017, Lloyd played in all 14 games as a backup in 2018 and had six tackles. He became a starter in 2019. In 14 games he had 91 tackles, 6.5 sacks and one interception which he returned for a touchdown. As a junior in 2020, Lloyd played in five games and had 48 tackles and two sacks. He returned to Utah for his senior year in 2021 rather than enter the 2021 NFL Draft. As a senior Lloyd played in all 14 games starting all but one, due to a controversial ejection vs Oregon State, and had 66 tackles, a Pac-12 leading eight sacks, and four interceptions including a pick-6 in the Pac-12 championship game. Lloyd also was First-team all Pac-12 and a consensus First-team All-American selection. On January 13, 2022, Lloyd declared for the 2022 NFL Draft.

Professional career

Jacksonville Jaguars
Lloyd was selected in the first round with the 27th overall pick by the Jacksonville Jaguars in the 2022 NFL Draft. Lloyd was named the Defensive Rookie of the Month for September. He recorded 24 tackles, six passes defended and two interceptions.

Personal life
Lloyd is the son of Joe Lloyd and Ronyta Johnson. Both of his parents served in the United States Navy.  Lloyd is a Christian.

References

External links
Jacksonville Jaguars bio
Utah Utes bio

1998 births
Living people
Sportspeople from Chula Vista, California
Players of American football from California
American football linebackers
Utah Utes football players
All-American college football players
Jacksonville Jaguars players